Cao County or Caoxian is a county in Heze City in southwestern Shandong Province, China. It borders Henan Province to the west.

History
Bo, one of the capitals of the Shang dynasty, lay in what is now Cao .

Prior to the Boxer Rebellion, Cao was an area noted for its lawlessness. When local garrisons were weakened during the First Sino-Japanese War, a militia known as the Dadaohui ("Great Sword Company") was set up. It operated until 1895 and may have inspired some of the Boxer Rebellion.

Administrative divisions
As 2012, this County is divided to 5 subdistricts, 19 towns, 1 ethic town  and 2 townships.
Subdistricts

Towns

Ethic Towns
 Houji Hui Town (侯集回族镇)

Townships
 Louzhuang Township (楼庄乡)
 Niuhongmiao Township (朱洪庙乡)

Demographics

Climate

Transport
Caoxian railway station
Zhuangzhai railway station

References

External links
 Official site

Counties of Shandong
Heze